José Denisson Silva dos Santos (born 29 November 1997), commonly known as Denisson Silva is a Brazilian professional footballer who plays as a right midfielder for Albanian club Dinamo Tirana.

Club career

Drenica
On 19 January 2021, Silva joined Football Superleague of Kosovo side Drenica. His debut with Drenica came on 9 February in the 2020–21 Kosovar Cup round of 8 against Ulpiana after being named in the starting line-up.

Career statistics

Club

References

1997 births
Living people
Brazilian footballers
Brazilian expatriate footballers
Brazilian expatriate sportspeople in Portugal
Brazilian expatriate sportspeople in Kosovo
Association football midfielders
Associação Olímpica de Itabaiana players
Liga Portugal 2 players
Campeonato de Portugal (league) players
S.C. Braga B players
Football Superleague of Kosovo players
KF Drenica players
Kategoria Superiore players
FK Dinamo Tirana players
People from Aracaju
Sportspeople from Sergipe